Mohamed Mijarul Quayes (2 April 1960 – 10 March 2017) was a Bangladeshi career diplomat. He was appointed ambassador to Brazil in 2014. He was the Bangladesh High Commissioner to the Court of St James's, United Kingdom from 2012 to 2014. Prior to this he served as the Foreign Secretary at Ministry of Foreign Affairs of the government of the People's Republic of Bangladesh. He was previously Ambassador Extraordinary and Plenipotentiary of the People's Republic of Bangladesh to the Russian Federation.

Previous to his posting to Moscow, Quayes was the Bangladeshi High Commissioner to the Maldives.

Education and career
Quayes was educated at Dhaka Residential Model College, the Department of International Relations, Dhaka University, and the John F. Kennedy School of Government at Harvard University. He was a Bangladesh Civil Service Cadre of 1982. He was an Edward S . Mason Fellow in Public Policy and Management and studied under Amartya Sen, Robert Nozick, Shirley Williams, Richard Neustad, Ernest May and Robert Vogel at Harvard. At Dhaka University, he was a fellow of the Centre for Alternatives. He was a life member of the UN Association of Bangladesh.  Quayes has taught at the North South University and BRAC University in Dhaka and has been a resource for the Foreign Service Academy, the National Defence College and the Public Administration Training Centre. He also taught aesthetics and the history of art at the National Academy of the Arts in Dhaka.

Quayes was taken to a hospital in Brasília in February 2017. He died from multiple organ failure on 10 March. He is survived by his wife and two daughters.

References

1960 births
2017 deaths
Bangladeshi diplomats
Ambassadors of Bangladesh to Brazil
Ambassadors of Bangladesh to Russia
High Commissioners of Bangladesh to the Maldives
High Commissioners of Bangladesh to the United Kingdom
Harvard Kennedy School alumni
Dhaka Residential Model College alumni
University of Dhaka alumni
Place of birth missing
Deaths from multiple organ failure
Mason Fellows